Samuelle Prater, known simply as Samuelle, is an American R&B singer who is a former member of the R&B group Club Nouveau. He was the lead singer on Club Nouveau's #1 Pop and Dance and #2 R&B hit remake of the Bill Withers classic, "Lean on Me".

He released his first and only solo album entitled, Living in Black Paradise on October 30, 1990 on Atlantic Records, which reached number 37 on the Billboard R&B Albums chart. This album featured his biggest solo hit, "So You Like What You See", which was accompanied by a music video featuring Tyra Banks. In October 2004, "So You Like What You See" appeared on the popular videogame Grand Theft Auto: San Andreas, playing on new jack swing radio station CSR 103.9.

References

Living people
American contemporary R&B singers
Year of birth missing (living people)